Alejandro Domínguez Escoto (born 9 February 1961) is a Mexican former professional footballer and manager.

Playing career

Club
He also played for Club América.

International
He represented Mexico at the 1986 FIFA World Cup.

Managerial career
After he retired from playing, Domínguez became a coach. He made his managerial debut with Puebla in 2002 and was an interim manager with Veracruz for three matches during 2007. He was an assistant manager for his former club, América, during 2010.

References

External links

1961 births
Living people
Footballers from Mexico City
Association football midfielders
Mexico international footballers
1986 FIFA World Cup players
Club América footballers
Tampico Madero F.C. footballers
Querétaro F.C. footballers
Mexican football managers
Club Puebla managers
F.C. Motagua managers
C.D. Veracruz managers
C.D. Olimpia managers
Mexican expatriate football managers
Expatriate football managers in Honduras
Mexican expatriate sportspeople in Honduras
Mexican footballers